You Get More Bounce with Curtis Counce! (later released as Councelation) is an album by American jazz bassist Curtis Counce recorded in 1956 and 1957 and released on the Contemporary label.

Reception
The Allmusic review by Scott Yanow statesthis was a band with plenty of solo strength. Their second Contemporary recording features five standards and two numbers by the leader. This excellent music falls somewhere between hard bop and cool jazz.

Track listing
All compositions by Curtis Counce except as indicated
 "Complete" - 5:51
 "How Deep Is the Ocean?" (Irving Berlin) - 6:35
 "Too Close for Comfort" (Jerry Bock, Larry Holofcener, George David Weiss) - 5:36
 "Mean to Me" (Fred E. Ahlert, Roy Turk) - 4:31
 "Stranger in Paradise" (Alexander Borodin, George Forrest, Robert Wright) - 7:03
 "Counceltation" - 6:01
 "Big Foot" (Charlie Parker) - 9:02  	  
Recorded at Contemporary Studios in Los Angeles, CA on October 8, 1956 (track 7), October 15, 1956 (track 5), April 27, 1957 (tracks 3 & 6), May 13, 1957 (tracks 1 & 2) and September 3, 1957 (track 4)

Personnel
Curtis Counce - bass
Jack Sheldon - trumpet
Harold Land - tenor saxophone
Carl Perkins - piano
Frank Butler - drums

References

Contemporary Records albums
Curtis Counce albums
1957 albums